is a Japanese light novel series written by Jougi Shiraishi and illustrated by Azure. SB Creative have released twenty volumes since April 2016 under their GA Novel label. A manga adaptation with art by Itsuki Nanao has been serialized online since November 2018 via Square Enix's online manga magazine Manga UP!. It has been collected in five tankōbon volumes. The light novel is licensed in North America by Yen Press, and the manga is licensed by Square Enix. An anime television series adaptation by C2C aired from October to December 2020.

Plot
Fascinated by the stories of Niké, a witch who traveled around the world, Elaina aspires to take the same course. Her determination of studying books and magic leads to her becoming the youngest apprentice witch to pass the sorcery exam. However, when Elaina attempts to receive training in order to become a full-fledged witch, she is rejected due to her extraordinary talents until she finds Fran, the "Stardust Witch", who accepts her. After earning her title, the "Ashen Witch", Elaina begins her exploration around the world, visiting and facing all kinds of people and places.

Characters

Elaina grew up reading stories about the adventures of a witch named Niké, who she does not know is her mother's alias; inspired, she chose to travel the world as well, even being given her mother's old title of "Ashen Witch" upon becoming a full-fledged witch. The story is told through her diary entries. 

Known as the "Stardust Witch", she is Elaina's mentor from a distant land. Beneath her laid-back attitude lies an incredibly powerful and knowledgeable witch. The most important thing she taught Elaina was to stand up for herself and not just endure mistreatment in the hope that it will all work out. She, along with Sheila, was an apprentice of Niké. Unlike Sheila, Fran works freelance for whoever needs magical assistance.

An apprentice witch from an eastern land. Relying on others for support, she secretly stole Elaina's witch brooch and then offered her shelter in an attempt to force her to stay with her. However, Elaina eventually figured her out and taught her to have more self-confidence. She later becomes a full-fledged witch, taking the title of "Charcoal Witch" to match Elaina, and starts working under Sheila at the United Magic Association. Saya is in love with Elaina, so she often has trouble parting with her when they meet.

Known as the "Night Witch", she is a member of the United Magic Association, which investigates the misuse of magic, as well as Saya and Mina's mentor. She, along with Fran, was a former apprentice of Niké. While Sheila can come across rude, she takes her job quite seriously.

Saya's younger sister. While she appears stern and aloof, she actually has a sister complex. She was separated from Saya when she started working under Sheila at the United Magic Association after becoming a full-fledged witch while Saya was still an apprentice. She is jealous of Elaina's closeness to Saya.

Production
At one point, Jougi Shiraishi was disappointed at the prospect that he would not become a professional writer. It was around this time when he discovered that it was possible to self-publish books on Amazon's Kindle service. As such, the series debuted as an e-book in 2014. Shiraishi professes that in terms of inspiration, he comes across various stories and material from other genres and formats. He also cites National Geographic and the ecology of animals and plants as the inspiration for the various countries and creatures featured in the series. When he thinks about the story, Shiraishi states that he focuses on the setting and world first.

Shiraishi requested the production staff of the anime adaptation, as the only major request to them, not to show any panties, in order to broaden the age range of the audience.

Media

Light novels
The series was acquired by SB Creative, who began publishing the series in light novel format through its GA Novel imprint with illustrations by Azure on April 15, 2016. Twenty volumes have been released as of March 15, 2023. Yen Press has licensed the series in North America and the first volume was published on January 28, 2020.

Manga
A manga adaptation by Itsuki Nanao began serialization on November 29, 2018 on the smartphone app and website Manga UP! from the publisher Square Enix, which published the first volume of the series on April 12, 2019; it has been compiled into five volumes as of March 7, 2023. The manga is published in English by Square Enix.

Anime
An anime television series adaptation was announced during a livestream for the "GA Fes 2019" event on October 19, 2019. The series was animated by C2C and directed by Toshiyuki Kubooka, with Kazuyuki Fudeyasu handling series composition, and Takeshi Oda adapting Azure's character designs. AstroNotes composed the soundtrack for the anime, which was later released in an album on January 27, 2021. The series ran for 12 episodes from October 2 to December 18, 2020 on AT-X and other channels. The opening theme is  performed by Reina Ueda, while the ending theme is  performed by ChouCho.

Funimation acquired the series and streamed it on its website in North America and the British Isles. AnimeLab simulcasted the series in Australia and New Zealand. Wakanim streamed the series in select European territories. On December 3, 2020, Funimation announced that the series would receive an English dub, which premiered the following day. Following Sony's acquisition of Crunchyroll, the series was moved to Crunchyroll. Muse Communication has licensed the series in Southeast Asia and South Asia and they streamed it on their Muse Asia YouTube channel.

Episode list

Reception
The light novel series ranked ninth in 2018 in Takarajimasha's annual light novel guide book Kono Light Novel ga Sugoi!, in the tankōbon category. It ranked sixth in 2019 and sixth again in 2020.

Notes

References

External links
 

2016 Japanese novels
Adventure anime and manga
Anime and manga about time travel
Anime and manga based on light novels
AT-X (TV network) original programming
C2C (studio)
Crunchyroll anime
Fantasy anime and manga
Gangan Comics manga
Japanese time travel television series
Japanese webcomics
Light novels
Muse Communication
Self-published books
Shōnen manga
Television series about witchcraft
Time loop anime and manga
Webcomics in print
Witchcraft in anime and manga
Witchcraft in written fiction
Yen Press titles